Cabo Camarón (literally, "Cape Shrimp") is a cape located on the Caribbean coast of Honduras at .  It is notable as the territory that Diego López de Salcedo of Trujillo contracted to conquer for Spain, and as the focus of territorial waters disputes for access to the fishing.

Notes 

Landforms of Honduras